The Brew Company is an independent award-winning craft brewery located in Sheffield, South Yorkshire, England. It produces a permanent range of cask ales as well as seasonal specials and house beers for pubs in the Sheffield area.

History and location
The brewery was started in 2008 by Peter Roberts with support from Sheffield Hallam University's Enterprise Challenge. Before establishing The Brew Company, Pete studied brewing at Brewlab, which operates from the University of Sunderland. The brewery is based close to the Kelham Island area of Sheffield, which is often referred to as the 'real ale trail'  due to its concentration of thriving real ale pubs and breweries.

Permanent Beers
Abyss Best Bitter - 4.2% ABV
Eclipse Porter - 4.7% ABV
Elixir Bitter - 4.0% ABV
Frontier IPA - 4.7% ABV
Slaker Pale Ale - 3.8% ABV
Hop Monster Hoppy Ale - 4.5% ABV
Yellow Rose 4.5% ABV

Seasonal/Special Edition Beers
Bock Dark Ale - 5.0% ABV
Spring Bock Light Ale - 3.8% ABV
St Petrus Stout - 5.0% ABV
Brewers Gold Pale Ale - 4.0% ABV
Hop Ripper IPA - 4.3% ABV

House beers
The Brew Company has four permanent outlets in Sheffield, with two permanent house beers 'Blonde' and Best Bitter at their own free house The Harlequin.  They also brew the permanent house beer for the Devonshire Cat (Devonshire Cat Pale Ale 4.0%) and Riverside Pale 4.2% for the "Riverside Live" pub and Anvil Porter for Forum Bars "The York" at Broomhill.

Awards
Spring Bock won 'Beer of the Festival' at the Sheffield All Stars Beer Festival on 12 May 2009.

Abyss Best Bitter won a Gold Award and Slaker Pale Ale won a Bronze Award at the Oakwood Beer Festival in February 2009.

St Petrus Stout won Gold at the Steel City Beer Festival 2009.

Hop Monster Won Gold in the best bitter category at the Steel City Beer Festival 2010, as well as 2nd place in the Beer of the Festival, and 2nd place in the Champion Beer of Sheffield.

Hop Monster also won Silver at the Magna White Rose Festival 2011.

References

External links
 Brew Company website
 Brewlab website

Manufacturing companies based in Sheffield
Beer and breweries in Sheffield